The 3rd constituency of Charente is a French legislative constituency in the Charente département.

Deputies

Election results

2022

 
 
 
 
 
 
 
 
 
|-
| colspan="8" bgcolor="#E9E9E9"|
|-
 
 

 
 
 
 
 

* PS dissident

2017

2012

2007

|- style="background-color:#E9E9E9;text-align:center;"
! colspan="2" rowspan="2" style="text-align:left;" | Candidate
! rowspan="2" colspan="2" style="text-align:left;" | Party
! colspan="2" | 1st round
! colspan="2" | 2nd round
|- style="background-color:#E9E9E9;text-align:center;"
! width="75" | Votes
! width="30" | %
! width="75" | Votes
! width="30" | %
|-
| style="background-color:" |
| style="text-align:left;" | Jérôme Lambert
| style="text-align:left;" | Socialist Party
| PS
| 
| 44.18%
| 
| 61.56%
|-
| style="background-color:" |
| style="text-align:left;" | Caroline Fombaron
| style="text-align:left;" | Union for a Popular Movement
| UMP
| 
| 29.83%
| 
| 38.44%
|-
| style="background-color:" |
| style="text-align:left;" | Ioana Vaudin
| style="text-align:left;" | Democratic Movement
| MoDem
| 
| 6.92%
| colspan="2" style="text-align:left;" |
|-
| style="background-color:" |
| style="text-align:left;" | Michelle Mauvillain
| style="text-align:left;" | Communist
| PCF
| 
| 3.76%
| colspan="2" style="text-align:left;" |
|-
| style="background-color:" |
| style="text-align:left;" | René Thromas
| style="text-align:left;" | Front National
| FN
| 
| 3.24%
| colspan="2" style="text-align:left;" |
|-
| style="background-color:" |
| style="text-align:left;" | Madeleine Labie
| style="text-align:left;" | The Greens
| VEC
| 
| 2.91%
| colspan="2" style="text-align:left;" |
|-
| style="background-color:" |
| style="text-align:left;" | Brigitte Moreau
| style="text-align:left;" | Movement for France
| MPF
| 
| 2.14%
| colspan="2" style="text-align:left;" |
|-
| style="background-color:" |
| style="text-align:left;" | Marie-Thérèse Gerault
| style="text-align:left;" | Far Left
| EXG
| 
| 2.12%
| colspan="2" style="text-align:left;" |
|-
| style="background-color:" |
| style="text-align:left;" | Agnès Malsacré
| style="text-align:left;" | Hunting, Fishing, Nature, Traditions
| CPNT
| 
| 1.70%
| colspan="2" style="text-align:left;" |
|-
| style="background-color:" |
| style="text-align:left;" | Anne Mainguy
| style="text-align:left;" | Far Left
| EXG
| 
| 0.83%
| colspan="2" style="text-align:left;" |
|-
| style="background-color:" |
| style="text-align:left;" | Joël Bouchaud
| style="text-align:left;" | Miscellaneous Right
| DVD
| 
| 0.69%
| colspan="2" style="text-align:left;" |
|-
| style="background-color:" |
| style="text-align:left;" | Robert Tixier
| style="text-align:left;" | Presidential Majority
| Maj Pres
| 
| 0.53%
| colspan="2" style="text-align:left;" |
|-
| style="background-color:" |
| style="text-align:left;" | Pascale Protzenko
| style="text-align:left;" | Independent
| DIV
| 
| 0.46%
| colspan="2" style="text-align:left;" |
|-
| style="background-color:" |
| style="text-align:left;" | Claire Tournier
| style="text-align:left;" | Far Right
| EXD
| 
| 0.42%
| colspan="2" style="text-align:left;" |
|-
| style="background-color:" |
| style="text-align:left;" | Jean Urroz
| style="text-align:left;" | Regionalist
| REG
| 
| 0.28%
| colspan="2" style="text-align:left;" |
|-
| colspan="8" style="background-color:#E9E9E9;"|
|- style="font-weight:bold"
| colspan="4" style="text-align:left;" | Total
| 
| 100%
| 
| 100%
|-
| colspan="8" style="background-color:#E9E9E9;"|
|-
| colspan="4" style="text-align:left;" | Registered voters
| 
| style="background-color:#E9E9E9;"|
| 
| style="background-color:#E9E9E9;"|
|-
| colspan="4" style="text-align:left;" | Blank/Void ballots
| 
| 2.55%
| 
| 2.65%
|-
| colspan="4" style="text-align:left;" | Turnout
| 
| 65.46%
| 
| 66.33%
|-
| colspan="4" style="text-align:left;" | Abstentions
| 
| 34.54%
| 
| 33.67%
|-
| colspan="8" style="background-color:#E9E9E9;"|
|- style="font-weight:bold"
| colspan="6" style="text-align:left;" | Result
| colspan="2" style="background-color:" | PS HOLD
|}

2002

 
 
 
 
 
 
 
 
 
|-
| colspan="8" bgcolor="#E9E9E9"|
|-

1997

References

3